Tutova was a weekly newspaper published in Bârlad, Romania between 1884 and 1892. The newspaper was published by editor and printer George Caţafany. The director of the newspaper was Panaite Chenciu. Among its contributors were Ştefan Neagoe (1838-1897) and Theodor Riga, professor at the Gheorghe Roşca Codreanu High School under the pen name "Herodot". 

Other publications with the name "Tutova" were published later in Bârlad, such as:

 Tutova - magazine of the students of the city of Bârlad published in August 1905
 Tutova - weekly newspaper, published irregularly from 29 September 1905 until 24 December 1909

References

Publications established in 1884
Publications disestablished in 1892
Newspapers published in Bârlad
Romanian-language newspapers
Defunct newspapers published in Romania
Defunct weekly newspapers